Julien Giovannetti (9 January 1914 – 29 January 1966) born in Morosaglia in Haute-Corse, was a French baritone at the Opéra-Comique of Paris, a specialist of Mozart who performed many operas around the world.

External links 
 Julien Giovannetti on Discogs

French operatic baritones
20th-century French male opera singers
1914 births
1966 deaths
People from Haute-Corse